This is a list of the seasons played by A.C.R. Messina, from their entry into the Prima Divisione in 1921 until the present day. The club's achievements in all major national and international competitions are listed.

Messina's greatest league success is its Serie B title in 1963. This led to the first of two spells in Serie A, which lasted for two years before relegation in 1965. Financial troubles saw the club drop as low as the seventh-division Promozione Sicilia by 1993, but a series of mergers and name changes allowed a meteoric rise in the late 1990s and early 2000s. The club was promoted after winning the sixth-division Eccellenza Sicilia in 1996, and a series of promotions saw them reach Serie A just eight years later. This second spell in the top division lasted three years, and included their best-ever result of 7th in 2005, missing out on a place in the UEFA Cup by just one place.

U.S. Messinese (1921–22)

Messina F.C. (1922–24)

U.S. Messinese (1924–41)

U.S. Mario Passamonte (1942–45)

A.S. Messina (1945–47)

A.C. Riunite Messina (1947–98)

A.S. Messina (1993–99)

U.S. Peloro (1994–97)

F.C. Messina Peloro (1997–09)

A.C. Rinascita Messina (2009–14)

A.C. Riunite Messina 1947 (2014–17)

A.C.R. Messina (2017–Date)

References

seasons
A.C.R. Messina